Darlene Vogel (born October 25, 1962) is an American actress and former model.

Career
Vogel's first feature film was the 1989 science fiction film, Back to the Future Part II and as the IFT intern in the pre-show segment for the 1991 film ride, Back to the Future: The Ride for the Universal movie parks.

Acting roles
Vogel has appeared in numerous TV roles, with probably best known role being a part on the USA Network TV series, Pacific Blue as Officer Chris Kelly from 1996 to 1999. She is also known for her role on the soap opera One Life to Live as Dr. Melanie Farrell McIver from January 2000 to October 2001. Vogel's other films include are Ski School, Angel 4: Undercover, and Ring of Steel. She has made guest appearances on TV shows, including Full House, Farscape,  Northern Exposure,  Boy Meets World and CSI: Crime Scene Investigation.

Personal life

Vogel and her husband, Mark, have a son and a daughter. An avid animal activist, Vogel and Howard provide a home for three dogs.

Vogel was once engaged to Canadian ice hockey player Adam Oates, however the couple cancelled their planned 1998 marriage at the last moment.

Filmography

Film

Television

Theme parks

References

External links

1962 births
Living people
American film actresses
American soap opera actresses
American television actresses
Female models from California
Actresses from California
21st-century American women